An order of merit is conferred by a state, government or royal family on an individual in recognition of military or civil merit.

Order of merit may also refer to:

 FIFA Order of Merit, for significant contribution to association football
 PDC Order of Merit, a world ranking system by the Professional Darts Corporation

See also
 National Order of Merit (disambiguation)
 Order of Military Merit (disambiguation)
 Order of Naval Merit (disambiguation)
 Order of Civil Merit (disambiguation) 
 Cross of Merit (disambiguation)
 Medal of Merit (disambiguation)
 Order (distinction)
 Socialist orders of merit
 Legion of Merit, a military award of the United States Armed Forces